Neodrillia princeps is a species of sea snail, a marine gastropod mollusc in the family Drilliidae.

Description
The length of the shell varies between 32 mm and 47 mm.

Distribution
This marine species occurs off French Guiana and Brazil.

References

External links
 Fallon P.J. (2016). Taxonomic review of tropical western Atlantic shallow water Drilliidae (Mollusca: Gastropoda: Conoidea) including descriptions of 100 new species. Zootaxa. 4090(1): 1–363
 

princeps
Gastropods described in 2016